The Ontario Teachers' Pension Plan Board is an independent organization responsible for administering defined-benefit pensions for school teachers of the Canadian province of Ontario. Ontario Teachers' also invests the plan's pension fund and it is one of the world's largest institutional investors, acting as a partner organization of the World Economic Forum. The plan is a multi-employer pension plan, jointly sponsored by the Government of Ontario and the Ontario Teachers' Federation.

Ontario Teachers' achieved a 11.1% one-year total-fund net return in 2021 and achieved its ninth consecutive fully funded year.

History
Ontario Teachers' was established on January 1, 1990. Until then, Ontario teachers' pensions had been sponsored solely by the Ontario government. Assets of the plan had been invested in government bonds only. Currently, it invests globally in fixed income, public and private equity markets, real estate, infrastructure, natural resources, credit and venture capital through the Teachers' Innovation Platform (TIP).

Organization
The plan administers the pensions for some 330,000 teachers, principals, and school administrators, and it pays pensions to some 148,000 retirees. In 2020, $6.74 billion in benefits was paid to members. Ontario Teachers' is headquartered in Toronto, with regional offices in London, New York, Hong Kong, Singapore, and Mumbai. Effective January 1, 2020, Jo Taylor succeeded Ron Mock as President and Chief Executive Officer. The Chair of Ontario Teachers' is Steve McGirr.

Investments
One of Canada's largest institutional investors, Ontario Teachers' reported having $241.6 billion in net assets as of December 31, 2021. It has an excellent track record for investment performance, with an average annual return of 9.7 per cent since inception in 1990.

Ontario Teachers' owns and manages a diversified portfolio of Canadian and international assets. Through its fully owned real estate subsidiary, Cadillac Fairview, Ontario Teachers' owns properties that include the Toronto-Dominion Centre, Toronto Eaton Centre, the Pacific Centre in Vancouver, the Rideau Centre in Ottawa, and White City Place in London, UK. Through its private equity investment arm, Private Capital, Ontario Teachers' owns interests in companies such as Munchkin, PODS, Techem, GFL Environmental, and Shearer's Foods. In 2001, Ontario Teachers' Pension Plan and Caisse de dépôt et placement du Québec were the sole two investors in a US$360 million fund raised by Canadian company Cordiant Capital. Ontario Teachers' also owns Camelot Group PLC, which holds an exclusive licence to operate the UK National Lottery. It acquired a share of the Irish National Lottery in 2014.

Ontario Teachers' owns a substantial portfolio of infrastructure assets, including stakes in Birmingham Airport, Bristol Airport, Copenhagen Airport, and London City Airport, as well as international water and power utilities. Alongside PSP Investments, Ontario Teachers' owns Cubico Sustainable Investments, a leading provider of renewable energy.

From 2003 to 2012, the fund was the principal owner of Maple Leaf Sports & Entertainment, the parent organization of the Toronto Maple Leafs, Toronto Raptors, Toronto FC and Toronto Argonauts. The franchise was sold to BCE Inc. and Rogers Communications in 2012.

In 2017, it acquired Mémora Servicios Funerarias, a Spanish funeral provider, from 3i.

In 2019, Ontario Teachers', along with Amazon and others, assisted in financing to help the New York Yankees regain ownership control of their regional sports network, the YES Network, resulting in a minority ownership in the network.

In 2022, the pension fund was targeting investments in India, opening an office in Mumbai in September. It had $178.5 billion in assets total.

In 2021 and 2022, Ontario Teachers' invested US$75 million in FTX and US$20 million in FTX.US respectively, through its Teacher's Venture Growth platform. Following FTX's collapse in early November 2022, Ontario Teachers' stated that it will write off the entirety of its US$95 million investment by the end of 2022.

ESG and responsible investing 

On June 6, 2018, a group of global institutional investors, led by Ontario Teachers' and CDPQ, in collaboration with the Government of Canada, announced a project to advance key G7 objectives. Partner Institutions AIMCo, Allianz, Aviva, CalPERS, CDPQ, Generali, Natixis Investment Managers, OMERS, Ontario Teachers', OPTrust, and PGGM pledged to commit resources, expertise and networks to three initiatives: enhancing expertise in infrastructure financing and development of emerging and frontier economies; opening opportunities for women in finance and investment worldwide; and speeding up the implementation of uniform and comparable climate-related disclosures under the FSB-TCFD framework.

On September 26, 2018, Ontario Teachers' joined finance, health and government leaders in signing the Tobacco-Free Finance Pledge (of the NGO Tobacco-Free Portfolios), which commits the pension plan to no longer invest in tobacco companies.

On January 21, 2021, Ontario Teachers' announced its commitment to net zero greenhouse gas emissions by 2050, disclosing that its strategy will focus on financing climate solutions that replace fossil fuels and reduce emissions.

Media coverage 
On the January 12, 2004 episode of Rick Mercer Report, comedian Rick Mercer had a short segment about the Ontario Teachers' Pension Plan, in which he humorously contrasted the plan's beneficiaries (i.e. teachers) with the investments the plan had made, including shopping malls and the tobacco industry.

On December 2, 2008, New York lawyer Marc Stuart Dreier was arrested at Ontario Teachers' Toronto offices and charged with impersonating, through his words and by the use of business cards, Michael Padfield, a senior lawyer with the pension plan. A receptionist in the Ontario Teachers' offices had become suspicious and notified Toronto police who promptly arrested him. Dreier was attempting to close a sale of forged Ontario Teachers' promissory notes, worth US$44.7 million, by meeting with the buyers right in the Ontario Teachers' offices.

A 2012 article in The Economist titled "Maple Revolutionaries" about Canada's largest public pension funds features Ontario Teachers', saying it pioneered a new style of investing in the 1990s by managing more of its portfolio internally and doing more direct investing. Then-Ontario Teachers' CEO Jim Leech called Canadian pension funds a "new brand of financial institution" likened to depoliticized sovereign-wealth funds.

See also 
 Teachers Insurance and Annuity Association of America

References

External links
 

 
Financial services companies established in 1989
Public pension funds in Canada
Investment companies of Canada
Private equity firms of Canada
Organizations established in 1989
Organizations based in Toronto
1989 establishments in Ontario
Infrastructure investment